The 2021 National Counties Championship was the 116th National Counties Cricket Championship season. It is contested in two divisions. Berkshire were the defending champions. The title was won by Oxfordshire by defeating Suffolk in the final by 178 runs. The final was played in Tring, Hertfordshire.

Standings

Format
Teams receive 16 points for a win, 8 for a tie and 4 for a draw. In a match reduced to a single innings, teams receive 12 points for a win, 8 for a draw (6 if less than 20 overs per side) and 4 points for losing. For matches abandoned without play, both sides receive 8 points. Bonus points (a maximum of 4 batting points and 4 bowling points) may be scored during the first 90 overs of each team's first innings.

Eastern Division
 Division 1

Suffolk were Eastern Division Champions.
Suffolk qualified for the NCCA Championship Final.
Cambridgeshire were relegated to Division Two.

 Division 2

Bedfordshire were Eastern Division Two Champions.
Bedfordshire were promoted to Division One.

Western Division
 Division 1

Oxfordshire were Western Division Champions.
Oxfordshire qualified for the NCCA Championship Final.
Wiltshire were relegated to Division Two.

 Division 2

Herefordshire were Western Division Two Champions.
Herefordshire were promoted to Division One.

Final
The final featured the teams which finished with the most points in each Division One, Suffolk and Oxfordshire. It began on 5 September 2021 at Tring Park with the result being a victory for Oxfordshire by 178 runs. Oxfordshire won their fifth title, the previous being in 1989, whilst Suffolk's most recent victory was its shared title in 2005.

References

2021 in English cricket
2021